The 2004 Ladbrokes.com World Darts Championship was the 10th anniversary of the PDC version of the World Darts Championship. The tournament took place between 27 December 2003 and 4 January 2004 at the Circus Tavern, Purfleet, England.

An extra round was added, with the top 16 seeds given a bye to the third round, bringing the total players at the televised stages to 48. Ladbrokes, who sponsored the event initially for one year in 2003, decided to extend their deal and the prize fund was increased to £256,000. The Dutch television station, RTL 5 and Sky Sports both extended their deals with the PDC by three years. PDC chairman Barry Hearn announced that the tournament would be shown in Malaysia on pay-per-view.

Defending champion and number two seed, John Part suffered a surprise first-round defeat to Mark Dudbridge, his first match of the 2004 campaign.

The final became only the second ever (and first PDC) world final to go to a sudden-death leg. The first time it happened was when Phil Taylor beat Mike Gregory in the 1992 BDO final, Taylor was again involved and came out victorious against Kevin Painter. He came from 4–1 down to win his 11th world title.

The two losing semi-finalists came from different ends of darts experience. 56-year-old Bob Anderson, a World Champion 16 years earlier lost to Painter and Wayne Mardle was making his first PDC World Championship semi-final appearance. Mardle lost to Taylor for the second year running, following a third-round defeat as an unseeded player in 2003.

Seeds

Prize money

New format
To accommodate the change in the number of entries into the competition to 48, the format of the World Championship was again changed. 16 qualifiers would contest the first round, with the eight winners going through to the second round to meet players ranked between 25 and 32 inclusive in the PDC. These eight winners would go through to join the top 24 in the third round, where the tournament proceeded from the last 32 to the Final.

Results

Representation from different countries
This table shows the number of players by country in the World Championship, the total number including round 1&2.

External links
Tournament format

PDC World Darts Championships
PDC World Darts Championship 2004
PDC World Darts Championship 2004
PDC World Darts Championship
PDC World Darts Championship
PDC World Darts Championship
Purfleet
Sport in Essex